The Stockport Pyramid, otherwise known as the Co-operative Bank Pyramid or simply The Pyramid is a commercial office building in Stockport, Greater Manchester.

History
The Pyramid was intended to be the 'signature building' within a larger development scheme that originally included multiple pyramid-shaped buildings. Sources vary on the number of pyramids that were originally planned, some state two further pyramids would be built, whilst others state four more pyramids were planned.

Construction was completed in 1992. During construction, the developers went into administration and the building was repossessed by The Co-operative Banking Group, who had financed the development. Between the completion of the building in 1992 and the occupancy by the Co-operative in 1995, the building was empty. The building was occupied by The Cooperative Bank from 1995 until they relocated to NOMA in Manchester city centre in 2018.

Several failed development projects near the site, including the pyramid's own unoccupancy immediately after construction and the Cooperative Bank's near-collapse in 2013, led to a superstitious consideration that the site was 'cursed'. The curse was announced as 'lifted' when nearby developments resumed in 2005 with the sale of office blocks in the surrounding business park.

The surrounding business park has been referred to as 'The Stopfordian Valley of the Kings', Kings Reach, or Kings Valley.

In 2019, the building was bought by the Saudi Arabian investment company Eamar Developments after being advertised for sale in the summer of 2018 for around £4.5 million. Eamar Developments have planned to let the site as office space after refurbishment.

Design
The pyramid has been described as 'avant-garde', 'aspirational' and an 'incongruous structure' compared to the industrial era buildings commonly found in Stockport. Contrary to it commonly being referred to as a pyramid, the Manchester Evening News claims that the building's 'shape is more accurately described as a  ziggurat'.

References

External links 
 pyramidstockport.com/

Pyramids
Buildings and structures in Stockport
Buildings and structures in the Metropolitan Borough of Stockport